The 2020 Malaysia FA Cup is the 31st season of the Malaysia FA Cup, a knockout competition for Malaysia's state football association and clubs. The winners will be assured a place for the 2021 AFC Cup group stage.

59 teams entered the competition.

Due to the COVID-19 pandemic, the tournament was cancelled.

Qualified teams
The following teams are qualified for the competition. Reserve teams are excluded.

Round and draw dates

Preliminary 
Key: (1) = Liga Super; (2) = Liga Premier; (3) = Liga M3; (4) = Liga M4

The draw for the preliminary round was held on 29 January 2020 at 15:00 involving 40 teams from Liga M3 and Liga M4.  9 teams from the Liga M3 and M4 have won byes in the first round. The matches will be held on February 15 and 16, 2020.

Notes: 

   PIB FC's participation was canceled due to a failure to complete the registration of players and officials into the MyPAS FAM system. As such, the PIB FC team was eliminated from the FA Cup 2020 and a 3-0 victory over the SSFC.

Round 1 (FA1)

Key: (1) = Liga Super; (2) = Liga Premier; (3) = Liga M3; (4) = Liga M4

The draw for the 1st round was held on 17 February 2020 at 15:00 involving 24 teams from Liga M3 and Liga M4.

Round 2 (FA2)

Key: (1) = Liga Super; (2) = Liga Premier; (3) = Liga M3; (4) = Liga M4

The draw for the 2nd round was held on 24 February 2020 at 15:45 involving 32 teams from Liga Super, Liga Premier, Liga M3 and Liga M4.

Round 3 (FA3)

Quarter-finals

Bracket

Summary
|-

|}

Matches

Semi-finals

Summary
|-

|}

Matches

Final

Top goalscorers

See also 
 2020 Malaysia Super League
 2020 Malaysia Premier League
 2020 Malaysia M3 League
 2020 Malaysia M4 League

References

External links
 Football Malaysia LLP website - Piala FA
 Result Reports 

Piala FA seasons
Malaysia
FA Cup
Malaysia FA Cup